This is a list of post-nominal letters (letters after people's names) that have been nominated by orders from government, and letters from professional associations in Australia.

General conventions

In general, postnominals are arranged in the following sequence:

 Honours promulgated by the Governor-General in the Commonwealth Government Gazette, e.g. Current National and former Imperial honours order of wearing,
 Honours and Appointments promulgated by a State Governor or Territory Administrator in the relevant State Government Gazette, e.g. Fellows of the Royal Society of NSW (FRSN), King's / Queen's Counsel (KC/QC), Senior Counsel (SC), and Justice of the Peace (JP),
 Degrees and diplomas, first grouped according to the corresponding Australian Qualifications Framework levels and ordered from lowest-to-highest, then in chronological order within those groups,
 Fellowships then memberships of professional and academic bodies,
 Parliamentary and military designations.

Full-stops are not usually used in postnominals.

Orders and decorations

Legal Offices

Academic awards
Degree and diploma abbreviations are defined by the conferring university and vary from one to another. Consult the awarding university for the approved abbreviation.

Some loose general rules and examples include:

Professional
Fellowship, Membership and Associate Membership of Professional Institutions.

Other Offices

Australian Army Corps abbreviations (RAAC, RAE, RAInf etc) are not recognised as postnominals although they are occasionally seen.

Notes

See also

 Australian Honours Order of Wearing
 List of post-nominal letters

Orders, decorations, and medals of Australia
Australia
Australian society-related lists